Shakhtyor Stadium is a multi-purpose stadium in Soligorsk, Belarus.  It is currently used mostly for football matches and is the home ground of Shakhtyor Soligorsk reserve team. The stadium original capacity was 5,000, until the new seats were installed which reduced the capacity to the current 2,000 people.

Until 1995 the stadium was a home ground for the senior Shakhtyor Soligorsk team, before they relocated to the renovated Stroitel Stadium. From 2013 until 2014 the stadium was used as a temporary home for Slutsk, while their local stadium was closed for renovation.

References

External links
Stadium profile at Soligorsk geo portal
Stadium profile at pressball.by

Football venues in Belarus
Buildings and structures in Minsk Region
Multi-purpose stadiums in Belarus